Hopea glabra is a species of plant in the family Dipterocarpaceae. It is native to Karnataka, Kerala and Tamil Nadu in India.

References

glabra
Flora of Karnataka
Flora of Kerala
Flora of Tamil Nadu
Endangered plants
Taxonomy articles created by Polbot